"Daddy, Sing to Me" is a song recorded by Canadian country music artist Lisa Brokop. It was released in 1990 as the first single from her debut album, My Love. It peaked at number 10 on the RPM Country Tracks chart in September 1990.

Chart performance

References

Lisa Brokop songs
1990 debut singles
1990 songs